Ariel Lanyi (born 10 October 1997) is an Israeli classical pianist.

Biography 
Ariel Lanyi was born in Jerusalem. He studied piano at the Conservatory of the Jerusalem Academy of Music and Dance with Lea Agmon and Yuval Cohen, as well as violin, composition, conducting, and jazz. He started performing as a pianist at age 5, played with an orchestra for the first time at age 6, started regular appearances on live broadcasts on Israel Radio at age 8, and was featured in several documentaries, including the ITV documentary Superhuman Genius. He subsequently studied piano at the Royal Academy of Music in London with Hamish Milne and Ian Fountain. In addition, he received tuition from eminent artists such as Imogen Cooper, Richard Goode, Robert Levin, Murray Perahia, Leif Ove Andsnes, as well as the late Ivan Moravec and Leon Fleisher.

In 2021, Lanyi won third prize at the Leeds International Piano Competition, and was a finalist at the Arthur Rubinstein International Piano Master Competition. In the same year, he was a prize winner at the inaugural Young Classical Artists Trust (London) and Concert Artists Guild (New York) International Auditions.

In addition to giving recitals in multiple countries, he has played with orchestras such as the Israel Philharmonic Orchestra, the City of Birmingham Symphony Orchestra, and the Royal Liverpool Philharmonic Orchestra, and has collaborated with conductors such as Trevor Pinnock, Andrew Manze, Peter Whelan, and Yi-An Xu. As a chamber musician, he has collaborated with eminent artists such as Charles Neidich, Torleif Thedéen, Noah Bendix-Balgley, and has participated in the Marlboro Music Festival.

Lanyi received critical acclaim for performances of Haydn, Beethoven, Schubert and Bartók.

Lanyi resides in London.

Recordings 
Romantic Profiles: Schumann, Carnival Scenes from Vienna Op. 26; Liszt, Fantasy and Fugue on the Theme B-A-C-H S. 260; Brahms, Seven Fantasies for Piano, Op. 116; Janáček, Piano Sonata. Lyte Records, 2012 (LR015).
Schubert: Moments Musicaux D. 780 and Piano Sonata, D. 850. Linn Records, 2021 (CKD 663).

References

External links 
 
 Biographical sketch at YCAT
 Interview with Ariel Lanyi at Cross-Eyed Pianist (2015)
 Interview with Ariel Lanyi by Damian Thompson in The Spectator (2019).
 Interview with Ariel Lanyi by the Henley Standard (2021)
 Interview with Ariel Lanyi at Cross-Eyed Pianist (2022)

21st-century classical pianists
Israeli classical pianists
Prize-winners of the Leeds International Pianoforte Competition
1997 births
Living people